is a Japanese manga series written by Akira Toriyama and illustrated by Toyotarou. A sequel to Toriyama's original Dragon Ball manga, it follows the adventures of Goku and friends during the ten-year timeskip after the defeat of Majin Buu. It began serialization in Shueisha's monthly shōnen manga magazine V Jump in June 2015. The manga is simulpublished in English by Viz Media and by Shueisha on their Manga Plus platform.

A 131-episode anime television series adaptation produced by Toei Animation aired in Japan from July 2015 to March 2018. A sequel film, Dragon Ball Super: Broly, was released in December 2018 and became the highest-grossing anime film of the franchise. A second film, Super Hero, was released on June 11, 2022.

Plot

Four years after the defeat of Majin Buu, Goku is seen working as a farmer, and his family and friends live peacefully. However, the God of Destruction Beerus awakens after decades of slumber. Beerus, along with his Angel assistant and teacher, Whis, seeks a warrior known as the Super Saiyan God, threatening to destroy the Earth if he loses to him. Goku transforms into the Super Saiyan God with the help of his friends, battles Beerus and loses, but his efforts appease Beerus, who spares the planet.

Afterwards, while Goku and Vegeta train, with Whis as their teacher, the remnants of Frieza's army collect the Dragon Balls and revive Frieza. After training, Frieza returns to Earth, seeking revenge. Despite achieving the Golden Frieza transformation, he is defeated by Goku and Vegeta, who have mastered the Super Saiyan Blue transformation. In spite, Frieza destroys the Earth, but Whis reverses time, allowing Goku to slay Frieza.

Champa, Beerus' brother and the God of Destruction of Universe Six, convinces Beerus to hold a tournament between the best fighters from their universes. The reward for the winner is the Super Dragon Balls, planet-sized Dragon Balls with nearly unlimited wish-granting abilities. Champa intends to swap Universe Six's barren Earth with Universe Seven's for their cuisine. Goku and his friends join the tournament. The tournament reaches its climax in a match between Goku and Hit. Unable to fight Hit at full power, Goku forfeits the match. Hit forfeits the final match, and Universe Seven wins. Beerus secretly wishes for the Super Dragon Balls to restore Universe Six's Earth.

Goku meets and befriends Lord Zenō, the Omni-King of all universes, and promises to bring him a friend. Later, Future Trunks reappears, with news of an enemy who resembles Goku, known as Goku Black. They discover that Goku Black is Zamasu, a Supreme Kai apprentice from Universe Ten, who used the Super Dragon Balls to steal Goku's body from a different timeline, as part of his plan to wipe out every mortal. Ultimately, Zamasu and the future timeline are erased from existence by Future Zenō, who accompanies Goku back to the present, where he becomes Present Zenō's friend. Future Trunks leaves for an alternate timeline.

Later, both Zenōs hold the Tournament of Power, where teams of fighters from eight of the twelve universes battle, with defeated universes being erased. Goku, his friends, Android 17, and a temporarily revived Frieza join the tournament. They battle formidable warriors, such as Universe Eleven's Jiren. Goku attains a new form known as Ultra Instinct, allowing him to fight unconsciously. The tournament ends with Goku and Frieza eliminating Jiren along with themselves, leaving Android 17 as the winner for Universe 7. He is awarded one wish from the Super Dragon Balls, and restores the erased universes. Frieza is permanently revived.

Frieza and his rebuilt army seek the Dragon Balls. During his search, Frieza meets two exiled Saiyan survivors, Broly and his father Paragus, the latter of whom wants revenge on Vegeta for his father exiling Broly before the Saiyan homeworld's destruction. Broly overpowers both Goku and Vegeta, until they fuse into "Gogeta". However, before Gogeta can kill Broly, he is saved by Frieza's henchmen Cheelai and Lemo. Frieza flees Earth, vowing revenge.

Goku and Vegeta are asked by the Galactic Patrol to recapture the fugitive Moro. In New Namek, Moro defeats them and uses the Namekians' Dragon Balls to restore his abilities and release all criminals in the Patrol's custody. Moro and the convicts rampage while Goku and Vegeta prepare for a rematch. Goku learns to use Ultra Instinct at will, while Vegeta heads to Planet Yardrat. Moro leads his army to Earth, and Goku's allies make a stand until Goku and Vegeta arrive and overpower him. In desperation, Moro fuses with the Earth, threatening to self-destruct. After absorbing energy fused by Vegeta's new powers, Goku slays Moro, saving the Earth.

Goku and Vegeta return to training with Whis and Beerus. Meanwhile, a Cerelian mercenary named Granolah learns from his employers, the Heeters, that Frieza is alive, and vows to destroy him and avenge his home planet of Cereal. Granolah uses his planet's Dragon Balls to become the strongest warrior in the universe, at the cost of his lifespan. The Heeters manipulate Goku and Vegeta into fighting Granolah. While Goku and Vegeta grow stronger fighting Granolah, and Vegeta gains a new Ultra Ego transformation, the two are defeated by Granolah. Before he can finish them, Granolah's foster father, the Namekian Monaito, reveals that Bardock, Goku's father, had saved them during Frieza's attack on Cereal forty years prior. During the attack, the Heeters, who were behind Cereal's destruction, killed Granolah's mother Muezli. Bardock saved Monaito and Granolah, defeating the youngest Heeter Gas. 

In the present, the Heeters Oil, Maki and Gas arrive to finish off Granolah, Monaito, Goku and Vegeta. Gas has become the strongest warrior in the universe, through a wish made to the Cerealian Dragon. Gas easily defeats Granolah and Goku as Vegeta retrieves a Senzu bean. Vegeta feeds the bean to Granolah, who confronts Gas, and overwhelms him. Elec arrives and removes Gas' pendant that was suppressing his powers. Gas goes berserk, but regains control of himself, with Elec's help. With Granolah and Vegeta incapacitated, Goku uses Instant Transmission to lure Gas away from Cereal. Goku, Granolah, Vegeta and Monaito retreat to Monaito's house to recuperate. Monaito gives Goku Bardock's scouter, which contains an audio recording of him defeating Gas through sheer will and determination.

As Monaito heals Granolah, Goku and Vegeta face off against a returning Gas. Despite their best efforts, they are defeated, though Gas' lifespan is also consumed in the fight, aging him greatly. Granolah eventually returns, and seemingly defeats him. As Monaito heals Goku, Vegeta, and Granolah, Gas, in a more powerful though decrepit state, returns and fatally injures Monaito. Granolah tends to Monaito, while Goku and Vegeta fight Gas, but are defeated. Frieza arrives on Planet Cereal, having been lured by Elec so Gas could kill him. Having spent 10 years training in a Hyperbolic Time Chamber, Frieza easily kills Gas and Elec, and reveals his new transformation, Black Frieza, easily defeating Goku and Vegeta. He hires Oil and Maki for his crew and leaves. Whis arrives and heals Monaito, retrieving Goku and Vegeta. After Whis retrieves Goku and Vegeta they go back to Beerus world and on the way Goku questions Whis "is Black freiza the strongest in the universe?" with Whis responding "possibly or someone else has emerged being the strongest." ( Some believe this to be Gohan beast from the dragon ball super super hero film). 

Production

When Dragon Ball Super was first announced, Akira Toriyama was reported to be credited for the "original story and character design concepts" of the anime, in addition to his regular role as series creator. Toyotarou, illustrator of the Dragon Ball Super manga, which began serialization before the anime began airing, explained that he receives the major plot points from Toriyama, before drawing the storyboard and filling in the details in between himself. He sends the manga storyboard to Toriyama for review, who edits the initial draft, making dialogue and art changes, before sending it back to Toyotarou, who illustrates the final draft and sends it to Shueisha for publication. Toriyama explained his involvement with the "Future Trunks arc" by saying that he created the story based on suggestions from the editorial department, "As with last time, I wrote the overall plot outline, and the scriptwriters have been compiling and expanded the story content into individual episodes, making various changes and additions, and generally doing their best to make the story more interesting." In addition to new characters designed by Toriyama, other characters for the "Universe Survival arc" were designed by Toyotarou, and a few by both. After covering the last story arc seen in the anime series in November 2018, the Dragon Ball Super manga continues with original story arcs.

For the "Galactic Patrol Prisoner arc", Toyotarou wanted the enemy Moro to be truly evil, like Piccolo Daimaō was in the original Dragon Ball. He utilized elements of goats, a common Western demon motif, for the character and made his clothes shinigami-esque. Because Jaco and the Galactic King have "classic alien"-like designs, Toyotarou wanted Merus to have a retro look as well and so gave him a silver bob cut. But he also gave the character bishōnen elements because he wanted him to be popular. For the Yardratian race, who are mentioned but never appear in Toriyama's original Dragon Ball manga, Toyotarou and his editor Victory Uchida decided to use both the design seen in Dragon Ball Z and a design created by Toriyama.

The "Granolah the Survivor arc" came about when Toyotarou created Granolah after having proposed various ideas for characters and being unsure if he should use existing characters or create new ones. After settling on a new one connected to the Saiyans, he sent Granolah to his editor Victory Uchida. After the two brainstormed story ideas, he was then given the go-ahead to bring it to Toriyama, who came up with the plot proposal and added the group known as The Heeters. It was Toriyama's decision to have the newly-revealed backstory on the Namekian race. Toyotarou called it the "sort of huge decision" that he (Toyotarou) can not make. Because Granolah's race went extinct in the story 50 years prior, Toyotarou made his clothing old-fashioned in addition to adding steampunk elements. After Toriyama reminded him that the Cerealians were not a warrior race but did enjoy fighting, Toyotarou imagined them as sharpshooters and gave Granolah his unique goggles. The goggles double as a communicator because he is a "lone warrior" and Toriyama had previously told him that having two characters converse better conveys characters' inner thoughts than having them talk to themselves. This led to the creation of the character Oatmeel. Toyotarou's designs for The Heeters were rejected three or four times before he came up with the final version, while Toriyama designed the Sugarians after Toyotarou's first two designs were rejected. Toriyama also designed the Namekian Monaito, whom he originally named "Slug" before it was changed to differentiate him from the character of the same name in the film Dragon Ball Z: Lord Slug (1991).

Anime production
Toei Animation producer Atsushi Kido previously worked on Dragon Ball Z for a brief time during the Freeza arc, while Fuji TV producer Osamu Nozaki said he has been a fan of the series since childhood. The Dragon Ball Super anime was originally directed by Kimitoshi Chioka. Morio Hatano, series director of Saint Seiya Omega (episodes #1–51), began sharing the series director credit with Chioka beginning with episode #28, before taking it over completely with #47. From episode #47 to #76, Morio Hatano shared the role of series director with Kōhei Hatano (no relation), another storyboard artist and episode director for the series.

Masako Nozawa reprises her roles as Son Goku, Son Gohan, and Son Goten. Most of the original cast reprise their roles as well. However, Jōji Yanami's roles as Kaiō-sama and the narrator were indefinitely taken over by Naoki Tatsuta as of episode 12, so that Yanami could take medical leave. Kōichi Yamadera and Masakazu Morita also return as Beerus and Whis, respectively.

The first preview of the series aired on June 14, 2015, following episode 164 of Dragon Ball Z Kai. The next day, the main promotional image for Dragon Ball Super was added to its official website and unveiled two new characters, who were later revealed to be named Champa and Vados, respectively. A thirty-second trailer including the new characters was uploaded to the series' official website on June 26, 2015.

The anime began airing on July 5, 2015, and was broadcast on Sundays at 9:00 a.m. on Fuji TV. On January 19, 2018, it was revealed that Super's timeslot would be replaced with GeGeGe no Kitarō starting on April 1, 2018. According to Amazon Japan, the final Blu-ray set indicated the series' end at episode 131. The series ended on March 25, 2018, with the conclusion of the "Universe Survival Saga". Fuji TV stated that no definite plans were made to either continue the series at a later date or discontinue it entirely.

Music

Norihito Sumitomo, the composer for Battle of Gods and Resurrection 'F, is scoring Dragon Ball Super. An original soundtrack for the anime was released on CD by Nippon Columbia on February 24, 2016.

The lyrics were penned by Yukinojo Mori who has written numerous songs for the Dragon Ball series. Mori wrote the lyrics for the rock song, while Takafumi Iwasaki composed the music.

The fourth ending theme song for episodes 37 to 49 is "Forever Dreaming" by Czecho No Republic in Japanese and Mystery Skulls in English. The eighth ending theme song for episodes 84 to 96 is "Boogie Back" by Miyu Inoue in Japanese and Lizzy Land in English. The eleventh ending theme song for episodes 122 to 131 is "Lagrima" by OnePixcel in Japanese and Amanda Lee in English.

Media
Manga

Dragon Ball Super is illustrated by artist Toyotarou, who was previously responsible for the official Resurrection 'F''' manga adaptation, began serialization in the August 2015 issue of V Jump, which was released on June 20, 2015. Shueisha periodically collects the chapters into tankōbon volumes, with the first released on April 4, 2016. Viz Media began posting free English translations of the manga chapters to their website on June 24, 2016. A print release of the first volume followed in spring 2017.

Anime

The anime television series was produced by Toei Animation, with individual episodes written by different screenwriters, and aired on Fuji TV from July 2015 to March 2018. The first 27 episodes readapt the events of the Battle of Gods and Resurrection 'F' films. The series ran for 131 episodes, broadcast from July 5, 2015, to March 25, 2018, on FNS (Fuji TV).

An English-subtitled simulcast of Dragon Ball Super was made available in North America and Europe through Crunchyroll and Daisuki. Following the closure of Daisuki, the hosted Dragon Ball Super episodes were transferred to the Dragon Ball Super Card Game website in February 2018 and was available until March 29, 2019.

On November 4, 2016, Funimation announced the company acquired the rights to Dragon Ball Super and would be producing an English dub, with many cast members of their previous English-language releases of Dragon Ball media reprising their respective roles. As well as officially announcing the dub, it was also announced they would be simulcasting the series on their streaming platform, FunimationNow. The Funimation English dub of Dragon Ball Super began airing on Adult Swim on Saturdays at 8 p.m., with an encore showing in their Toonami block later that night at 11:30 p.m. starting on January 7, 2017, alongside Dragon Ball Z Kai: The Final Chapters.Dragon Ball Super received a separate English-language dub produced by Los Angeles-based Bang Zoom! Entertainment for the Asian market. It premiered on the Toonami channel in Southeast Asia and India on January 21, 2017. A sneak preview of the English dub's first episode aired on December 17, 2016. Production on the Bang Zoom! dub ended after episode 27 as Toonami Asia and India ceased transmission.
Later in March 2022 Cartoon Network started broadcasting India in Hindi,Tamil,Telegu. The first 26 episodes being licensed by bangzoom
dub and rest by Funimation itself.

In Australia, ABC Me started airing Dragon Ball Super on November 3, 2018, with a new episode every Saturday at 2:45 pm. In the United Kingdom, the series aired on Pop from July 1, 2019, with episodes first airing at 7pm on weekdays. As of 2022, the series now airs on CBBC and can also be found on BBC iPlayer

Films

An animated film, Dragon Ball Super: Broly, was the first film in the Dragon Ball franchise to be produced under the Super chronology. Released on December 14, 2018, with a new art style, most of the film is set after the "Universe Survival" story arc (the beginning of the movie takes place in the past). A second Dragon Ball Super film was confirmed to be in pre-production on June 4, 2019, by Toei executive Akio Iyoku. Iyoku feels that the film's original story "will probably be totally different [from Broly]." On July 23, 2021, the sequel's official title was revealed as Dragon Ball Super: Super Hero.

Home video
In Japan, the anime series was released on Blu-ray and DVD by Happinet between December 2015 and July 2018, with each "Box" also containing textless opening and closing credits sequences and packaged with a booklet. In North America, Funimation began releasing the series from July 2017, again on both DVD and Blu-ray, containing both English-dubbed and English-subtitled Japanese versions; the Blu-ray releases generally also contain interviews with the English cast and textless opening/closing credits sequences. Funimation's localized releases are distributed in the United Kingdom and Australasia by Manga Entertainment and Madman Entertainment respectively.

Japanese

English

Merchandise
Bandai announced that a line of Dragon Ball Super toys would be available in the United States in summer 2017. Bandai has also announced the updated Dragon Ball Super Card Game that starts with one starter deck, one special pack containing 4 booster packs and a promotional Vegeta card and a booster box with 24 packs. It was released on July 28, 2017. A line of six Dragon Ball Super Happy Meal toys were made available at Japanese McDonald's restaurants in May 2017.

Reception
Manga reception

All four volumes of Dragon Ball Supers manga adaptation have charted on Oricon's weekly list of the best-selling manga; volumes one and two sold 29,995 and 56,947 copies in their debut weeks respectively. Volume three was the fourth best-selling for its week with 92,114 copies sold, and volume four was fourth its week with 150,889. According to Nielsen BookScan, the English version of volume one was the second best-selling graphic novel of May 2017, the ninth of June, the fourteenth of July, and the eighteenth of August. Dragon Ball Super volume 4 topped NPD BookScan's graphic novels list for January 2019.

In Japan, the manga's tankōbon volumes 1 and 2 sold 594,342 copies , volume 3 sold 236,720 copies , volume 4 sold 267,417 copies , volume 5 sold 400,000 copies , volume 6 sold 216,871 copies , volume 7 sold 208,796 copies , volume 8 sold 314,269 copies , volume 9 sold 188,027 copies , volume 10 sold 196,204 copies , volume 11 sold 119,283 copies , volume 12 sold 146,305 copies , volume 13 sold 155,095 copies , volumen 14 sold 95,101 copies , volumen 15 sold 150,971 copies , volume 16 sold 107,812 copies , volume 17 sold 156,744 copies  and volumen 18 sold 193,333 copies . According to Oricon's Yearly Sales Ranking 2020 - Top 50, Dragon Ball Super ranked at #38 with Yearly Sales - 1,019,655 Copies Sales. This adds up to at least 3,747,280 tankōbon copies sold in Japan .
Tom Speelman of ComicsAlliance noted that Toyotarou's condensed and altered versions of the Battle of Gods and Resurrection 'F arcs made it a lot easier to speed through and added suspense. He also said that for the first time he could not decide whether the anime or manga was superior.

Anime reception

The anime adaption received generally positive reviews from critics and fans. The first episode was highly praised from initial reactions for its improved quality. Richard Eisenbeis of Kotaku praised the series' title sequence and said "My middle-school self is so happy right now, you guys." Jamieson Cox of The Verge also praised the title sequence and said that "Dragon Ball Super's intro will have you begging for its North American release". Cox was also surprised that, considering how popular the franchise is, the series did not launch internationally at the same time. He called it "a move that wouldn't be unprecedented" giving Sailor Moon Crystal as an example.

However, the fifth episode received harshly negative responses from Japanese and Western audiences due to its poor animation style compared to the previous four episodes. These problems continued at episode twenty-four, and several more episodes onward. Dragon Ball Kai and Resurrection 'F' producer Norihiro Hayashida felt that the criticism was overblown. He said that people were criticizing the entire series based on a few bad sequences that were done by new animators. He went on to explain a quality decline in the anime industry that he believes is the result of studios cutting time given for post-production and not allowing for reviews of the final product.

Despite this, the Champa Arc was praised for improving its animation. Episode 39 was noted improved animation and praised fighting sequences. Attack of the Fanboy reported that "Dragon Ball Super" episode 39 may be the best installment of the series to date. Goku and Hit's fight "starts off explosively from the get-go." The Future Trunks Arc also garnered positive response from fans and critics alike. IGN's Shawn Saris acclaiming Episode 66, stating that, "Episode 66 of Dragon Ball Super has a few missteps but ultimately leads to a great final battle with Zamasu." However, Anime News Network criticized the poor animation and narrative quoted as "shameless soap opera" based on the handling of the cast.

The final arc, "Universe Survival Arc," particularly episodes, 109/110 and 116 have been cited as some of the Super series' best episodes due to Goku's new power up form known as the Ultra Instinct; Despite this praise, Jay Gibbs of ComicsVerse criticized the series for its inconsistent narrative, having heard "an explanation within an episode, then see that very explanation invalidated seconds later."

The United States premiere of Dragon Ball Super obtained 1,063,000 viewers for its 8 p.m. showing on Adult Swim. Episodes 130 and 131 were live streamed in various cities across Latin American countries including Mexico, El Salvador, Bolivia, Ecuador, and Nicaragua for free in public venues. The public screenings drew large record audiences, which included filling stadiums in Mexico and other Latin American countries, with each screening drawing audiences numbering in the thousands to the tens of thousands.

Even though the fan reaction has been positive, Dragon Ball Super has been criticized by fans for lacking the blood and gore that was present in its predecessor Dragon Ball Z. This is, however, due to the fact that the series is targeted towards a younger demographic than the previous installments, and as such, censorship would not allow such content to be shown on a television program targeted towards children. A Dragon Ball Super'' episode received a major complaint by Japan's Broadcasting Ethics and Program Improvement Organization as the part of the story involved Master Roshi making multiple sexual attacks on the female character Yurin.

Accolades
2017 Crunchyroll Anime Awards:
 Best Continuing Series – Dragon Ball Super – Nominated

2018 Crunchyroll Anime Awards:
 Best Fight Scene (Presented by Capcom) – Jiren vs. Goku – Nominated
 Best Continuing Series (Presented by VRV) – Dragon Ball Super – Winner

Notes

References

External links
 
 
 
 
 
 

Super
2015 anime television series debuts
Adventure anime and manga
Akira Toriyama
Anime and manga about time travel
Anime series based on manga
Crunchyroll Anime Awards winners
Crunchyroll anime
Fantasy anime and manga
Fuji TV original programming
Interquel television series
Japanese time travel television series
Martial arts anime and manga
Martial arts television series
Shueisha franchises
Shueisha manga
Shōnen manga
Television series set on fictional planets
Time loop anime and manga
Toei Animation television
Toonami
Viz Media manga